Berta Jikeli (19 April 1911 – 7 October 2000) was a Romanian athlete. She competed in the women's discus throw at the 1928 Summer Olympics. She was the first woman to represent Romania at the Olympics.

References

1911 births
2000 deaths
Athletes (track and field) at the 1928 Summer Olympics
Romanian female discus throwers
Olympic athletes of Romania
Place of birth missing